The Romani crucifixion legend is a story of how a blacksmith made the nails of the cross upon which Jesus Christ was crucified.

Versions
The condemnatory version states that as he made the nails to crucify Jesus Christ, the blacksmith and his kin were condemned to wander the earth and never settle.

Another version does not condemn blacksmiths. It states that the blacksmith was addressed by God in a dream, in which he was instructed to make four nails, but he was only instructed to hand over three of them, because the fourth nail was supposed to be used to pierce the heart of Jesus. In return, God gave his descendants the right to wander the earth rather than curse them to wander it, and he also granted them the right to steal from non-Romanies without breaking the 7th of the Ten Commandments "Thou shalt not steal".

See also
 Jewish deicide
 Romani people
 The Wandering Jew

References

External links
 George Eli website
 Nails of Crucifixion.
 Gypsy Migration: India through Europe - Zilliah

Antiziganism
Christian folklore
Crucifixion of Jesus
Romani-related controversies
Religious controversies
Stereotypes of Romani people